Frederic Sumpter Guy Warman (5 November 1872 – 12 February 1953) was an Anglican bishop who held three separate episcopal appointments between 1919 and 1947.

He was educated at Merchant Taylors' and Pembroke College, Oxford and ordained priest in 1896. After a curacy at Leyton (1895–99) and Hastings (1899–1901), he was Vice Principal of  St Aidan's College, Birkenhead. He was Vicar of Birkenhead from 1902 to 1907; Principal of  St Aidan's College, Birkenhead from 1907 to 1916 and Vicar of Bradford from 1916 to 1919. He was elevated to the episcopate in 1919. After four years in Cornwall as Bishop of Truro he was translated to Chelmsford in 1923 and six years later to Manchester. His translation to Manchester was effected by the confirmation of his election, on 21 January 1929 at York Minster.

From 1910 to 1914 he was editor of The Churchman jointly with Dawson Dawson-Walker, professor of Biblical
Exegesis at Durham University.

He retired in 1947 and died six years later. He had married Gertrude, the daughter of surveyor Norwood Earle, and had two sons. His son, Francis Frederic Guy, was later Archdeacon of Aston.

References

1872 births
People educated at Merchant Taylors' School, Northwood
Alumni of Pembroke College, Oxford
Bishops of Chelmsford
Bishops of Truro
Bishops of Manchester
1953 deaths
20th-century Church of England bishops